SMOP or SMOPS may refer to:

 Small matter of programming, a phrase in software development
 School of Maritime Operations (SMOPS), of the Royal Navy; See HMS Mercury 
 Singapore Mathematical Olympiad for Primary Schools; See Hwa Chong Institution
 Super Megaton Ohzumo Powers, a wrestling tag team comprising Ryota Hama and Akebono Tarō